Ronald Edward Zupko (5 August, 1938 -- 8 November, 2021) was an authority on historical metrology (the study of the history of weights and measures) with an academic background in medieval history. He was known for his books on the history of weights and measures, and had written numerous dictionary and encyclopedia entries on historical measurement units.

Born in Youngstown, Ohio, Zupko received his Ph.D. from the University of Wisconsin–Madison and taught at Marquette University from 1966 until retiring in 2002.

Professor Zupko was a member of the Comité International pour la Métrologie Historique, Institute for Advanced Study (associate member), Mediaeval Academy of America, Economic History Association, National Association of Watch and Clock Collectors, Midwest Medieval Association, Pi Gamma Mu, and Phi Alpha Theta.

Published works

British Weights and Measures: A History from Antiquity to the Seventeenth Century
hardcover: 224 pages, University of Wisconsin Press (1977), 

French Weights and Measures Before the Revolution: A Dictionary of Provincial and Local Units
hardcover: 256 pages, Indiana University Press (1979) 

Italian Weights and Measures from the Middle Ages to the Nineteenth Century
hardcover: 339 pages, American Philosophical Society (1981) 

 Dictionary of Weights and Measures for the British Isles: The Middle Ages to the 20th Century
hardcover, 520 pages, American Philosophical Society (1985) 

 Revolution in Measurement: Western European Weights and Measures Since the Age of Science
hardcover: 548 pages, American Philosophical Society (1990) 

Straws In The Wind: Medieval Urban Environmental Law--the Case Of Northern Italy
co-authored with Robert A Laures
paperback: 160 pages, Westview Press (1996)

Bibliography

Contemporary Authors, vol. 13 (1984)

References

External links
 YouTube video (14:36) Dr. Ronald Zupko on The Difference Network at Marquette University
 Marquette University History Department, online newsletter, Spring 2009, announcements
 Marquette University - Raynor Memorial Libraries - HISTORY DEPARTMENT - RONALD EDWARD ZUPKO COLLECTION

1938 births
Living people
Metrologists
University of Wisconsin–Madison alumni
Marquette University faculty
People from Youngstown, Ohio